Yuki Kubo (born 24 May 1988) is a Japanese handball player for Daido Steel and the Japanese national team.

He represented Japan at the 2019 World Men's Handball Championship.

References

1988 births
Living people
Japanese male handball players
Handball players at the 2014 Asian Games
Asian Games competitors for Japan
21st-century Japanese people